Shortparis is a Russian experimental group formed in Saint Petersburg in 2012.

History 
Nikolai Komyagin, Alexander Ionin, and Pavel Lesnikov met in their hometown, Novokuznetsk, and formed Shortparis in 2012 upon moving to Saint Petersburg. They were later joined by St. Petersburg natives Danila Kholodkov and Alexander Galyanov.

In 2013, Shortparis released their debut album Docheri, with songs in English and French. In 2017, they released the album Paskha. In contrast to their previous album, all of the songs on Paskha are in Russian. In 2019, Shortparis released their third album, Tak zakalyalas' stal.

In September 2020, Shortparis released the single "KoKoKo / Struktury ne vykhodyat na ulitsy" and an accompanying music video. The title of the track refers to a piece of graffiti from the 1968 Paris riots.

In January 2021, Shortparis contributed a track to the album Sokhrani moyu rech' navsegda, a compilation of songs based on Osip Mandelstam's work, released in honor of the 130th anniversary of the poet's birth.

In June 2021, Shortparis released their fourth studio album, Yablonny sad.

During the 2022 Russian invasion of Ukraine, Shortparis released a music video protesting against war.

Live performances 
Shortparis opened for The Kooks in 2015 and alt-J in 2017 at Saint Petersburg's A2. The band started gaining attention in English-language music publications for their performances at Haldern Pop Festival, MENT Festival, OFF Festival, Pop-Kultur Berlin, and Station Narva Festival in 2018. In April 2018, Shortparis performed alongside Kazuskoma, Spasibo, Glintshake, and Elektroforez in Minsk, Warsaw, Poznan, Berlin, and Kaliningrad as part of a tour showcasing Russian bands. In May 2019, Shortparis undertook their first UK tour, including performances at Liverpool Sound City and The Great Escape Festival. In August 2019, they played at Brave! Factory Festival in Kyiv.

Musical style 
Shortparis performs songs in Russian, French, and English. According to John Doran of The Quietus, Shortparis is following in Sergey Kuryokhin's legacy of provocative performance art; Doran describes the group as "Ambitious, bombastic, incredibly pretentious, erotic, thrilling, impossible to pin down, vaguely deviant, fun to dance to and full of revolutionary potential".

Members

Current line-up 
 Nikolai Komyagin — vocals (2012—present)
 Alexander Ionin — guitar, bass, accordion (2012—present)
 Pavel Lesnikov — drums, sampling (2012—present)
 Danila Kholodkov — drums, percussion (2012—present)

Former members 
 Alexander Galyanov — guitar, keyboards (2014—2022)

Timeline

Discography

Studio albums 
 2013 - Docheri
 2017 - Paskha
 2019 - Tak zakalyalas stal
 2021 - Yablonny sad

EPs/mini-albums 
 2013 — The Daughters (B-Sides)
 2022 — Zov ozera (soundtrack for the theatre play "Берегите ваши лица" ("Take Care of Your Faces"))
 2022 — NOVOE NOVOE

Singles 
 2012 — Amsterdam
 2015 — Novokuznetsk
 2015 — Ma Russie
 2017 — Tutu
 2018 — Styd
 2018 — Strashno
 2020 — KoKoKo / Struktury ne vykhodyat na ulitsy
 2021 — Govorit Moskva

Awards and nominations 
Shortparis made the shortlist for GQ Russia's "Discovery of the Year" award in 2019. At the 2019 Jager Music Awards, Shortparis won Band of the Year, as well as Single of the Year and Video of the Year for "Strashno".

Media appearances 
Shortparis appeared in the 2018 film Leto, performing a cover of David Bowie's "All the Young Dudes". In 2019, their song "Chto-to osoboe vo mne" featured in the episode "Chapter 4: SYZYGY" of season 2 of The OA.

References

External links 
 

 &  Interview at horsdoeuvre.fr

Musical groups from Saint Petersburg
Musical groups established in 2012
Russian electronic music groups
Russian experimental musical groups